Siaqul may refer to:
 Siaqul-e Olya
 Siaqul-e Sofla